Julien Schepens (19 December 1935 – 16 August 2006) was a Belgian professional road bicycle racer. He won a stage in the 1960 Tour de France and also wore the yellow jersey for one day after his stage win. Other career highlights include stage wins in Paris–Nice and Four Days of Dunkirk as well as winning the Grand Prix de Denain in 1962.

Major results

1953
 National novice road race Championship
1954
 National amateur road race Championship
1956
Kortemark
Omloop Leiedal
1956
Anzegem
 National independents road race Championship
Ruiselede
1957
Beernem
1960
Bankprijs Roeselare
Omloop der drie Proviniciën
Mandel-Leie-Schelde
Tour de France:
Winner stage 1A
Wearing yellow jersey for one day
1962
Grand Prix de Denain
Eizer Overijse

External links 

Official Tour de France results for Julien Schepens

Belgian male cyclists
Belgian Tour de France stage winners
1935 births
2006 deaths
People from Anzegem
Cyclists from West Flanders